Jos Bax (29 March 1946 – July 2020) was a Dutch professional footballer who played as a goalkeeper for RPC, EVV Eindhoven, Helmond Sport, VVV, Overpelt and VOS.

Career
After playing for amateur club RPC, he signed for EVV Eindhoven in 1965. As his registration was not done in time he was ineligible for the 1965–66 season, and played handball instead. At Eindhoven he made 80 league and 2 Cup appearances. He later played for Helmond Sport and VVV. He played his only league match for VVV on 7 March 1976 against FC Volendam. He then played in Belgium for Overpelt before finishing his career back in the Netherlands with amateur club VOS.

References

1946 births
2020 deaths
Footballers from Eindhoven
Dutch footballers
FC Eindhoven players
Helmond Sport players
VVV-Venlo players
Eerste Divisie players
Association football goalkeepers
Dutch expatriate footballers
Dutch expatriate sportspeople in Belgium
Expatriate footballers in Belgium